Trombley is an unincorporated community in Wood County, in the U.S. state of Ohio.

History
Trombley was originally called Blake, and under the latter name was platted in 1885. The present name honors one Mr. Trombley, the owner of a sawmill built on the site in 1885. A post office called Trombley was established in 1888, and remained in operation until 1908.

References

Unincorporated communities in Wood County, Ohio
Unincorporated communities in Ohio